William Edmund Crump (1809 or 1810 – January 3, 1889) was the first Speaker of the Texas House of Representatives following statehood. A representative from Austin County, Crump was a novice in political circles, having held no previous public office in Texas either in the Republic or at the local level.  Despite his lack of experience, he was elected Speaker on the first ballot without any substantial opposition.

Life

Crump was born in North Carolina.  Nothing is known of his early life, until his marriage to an Rosa C. Ballantine in North Carolina in 1836.  Subsequently, he moved his family to Vicksburg, Mississippi and in the early 1830s moved his family to Texas. Settling his family along the Brazos River east of Bellville, and established Crump"s Ferry, which can be seen on Texas Maps of 1836. Crump's Ferry was not far north of San Felipe, where Stephen F. Austin had earlier founded the headquarters of his first colony, Crump established a plantation, Crump's Ferry. Both of them had 1 child together, William Edmund Crump Jr.

In Texas, Crump became involved in one brief military venture, the Vasques Campaign that countered a Mexican raid on San Antonio in 1842. Crump remained in Austin County for the rest of his life, at one point becoming County Judge. He died in Bellville on January 3, 1889.

Politics

Crump was reelected state representative twice. He served in the 2nd Legislature and part of the 3rd Legislature, then resigned and vacated legislative office completely and returned to his home near Bellville. A large landholder, Crump eventually became one of the wealthiest men in the region.

Elected to the Texas House of Representatives following statehood, he presided as Speaker for most of the 1st Legislature. His tenure was punctuated by a leave of absence from March 3 to March 16, 1846 and by his subsequent resignation on May 1, 1846, 12 days before the 1st Texas Legislature adjourned.  Among its other accomplishments, the 1st Legislature created over 30 counties, organized a set of courts, established a militia, authorized a state penitentiary, and provided for a regular census and a system of taxation.

References

 

19th-century births
1889 deaths
Speakers of the Texas House of Representatives
Members of the Texas House of Representatives
Year of birth uncertain
19th-century American politicians